Purje is a surname. Notable people with the surname include:

Ats Purje (born 1985), Estonian footballer
Eino Purje (1900–1984), Finnish middle-distance runner